Heart & Soul is an album by saxophonist Teddy Edwards which was recorded in 1962 and released on the Contemporary label.

Reception

Allmusic awarded the album 3 stars stating "Edwards is in typically fine form".

Track listing 
All compositions by Teddy Edwards except as indicated
 "Smokin'" (Teddy Edwards, Gerry Wiggins) - 6:08  
 "No Regrets" - 4:48  
 "Secret Love" (Sammy Fain, Paul Francis Webster) - 8:22  
 "Little Steddy" - 6:08  
 "Wiggin'" (Wiggins) - 6:27  
 "A Bag of Blues" - 6:22  
 "Heart and Soul" (Hoagy Carmichael, Frank Loesser) - 3:29

Personnel 
Teddy Edwards - tenor saxophone
Gerry Wiggins - organ
Leroy Vinnegar - bass
Milt Turner - drums

References 

Teddy Edwards albums
1962 albums
Contemporary Records albums